Clay Township is one of eleven townships in LaGrange County, Indiana. As of the 2020 census, its population was 3,823, up from 3,424 at the previous census.

According to the 2020 "ACS 5-Year Estimates Data Profiles", 24.4% of the township's population spoke only English, while 70.6 spoke an "other [than Spanish] Indo-European language" (basically Pennsylvania German/German).

Geography

Demographics

References

External links
 Indiana Township Association
 United Township Association of Indiana

Townships in LaGrange County, Indiana
Townships in Indiana